Charles Cole is the name of:

People
 Charles A. Cole, member of the 130th New York State Legislature
 Charles C. Cole (New York), member of the 118th New York State Legislature
 Charles Cleaves Cole (1841–1905), U.S. federal judge
 Charlie Cole (lawyer) (born 1927), Attorney General of Alaska Charles E. Cole
 Charles H. Cole (1871–1952), American military and political figure
 Charles H. Cole (banker) (1847–1906), American banker
 Charles Nelson Cole, dean of Oberlin College; father of the biophysicist Kenneth Stewart Cole
 Tom Cole (writer), playwright and screenwriter Charles Thomas Cole (1933–2009)
 Charles W. Cole (1906–1978), president of Amherst College and U.S. Ambassador to Chile
 Charles Cole, shoe manufacturer, founder and president of Five Ten Footwear
 Charles Cole, mountain climber, member of the "Jolly Roger" ascent on El Capitan, 1979

Fictional characters
 Buddy Cole (character) (Charles Budderick Cole), a fictional character created by the actor-comedian Scott Thompson

See also
 Charlie Cole (disambiguation)
 Charles Coles (disambiguation)